The thoracic spinal nerve 7 (T7) is a spinal nerve of the thoracic segment.

It originates from the spinal column from below the thoracic vertebra 7 (T7).

References

Spinal nerves